Palliser is a railway point which straddles the shores of the Kicking Horse River in the East Kootenay region of southeastern British Columbia.

Name origin
Although named after John Palliser, leader of the Palliser expedition, he never visited this area. Sir James Hector, another member of the party, explored this valley.

Railway
The westward advance of the Canadian Pacific Railway (CP) rail head passed through Palliser around September 1884.

At this location in 1884, a  tunnel was completed, but collapsed in 1887. A diversion created the sharp curve and three smaller curves. For safety, passenger cars were clamped together to prevent uncoupling.

In 1921, an eastbound freight train struck a cave-in along the  curve. Seven crew were killed, and three hours later, the wreck burst into flames.

Early community
By 1889, Wilmer Cleveland Wells operated a sawmill. By 1890, a general store and hotel were also present. A post office existed 1894–1914. The store was short-lived, but a hotel accommodated visitors into the early 1900s.

In 1901, a Pinkerton Detective agent tracked a bank robber to the community. That year, the population peaked at about 100. The sawmill closed about 1908 but a watchman remained until the completion of clearing the site around 1915. The 1911 Census lists eight residents. By 1918, the place was deserted.

Maps

Footnotes

References

Ghost towns in British Columbia